Murphy Grist Mill, also known as the Old Mill, is a historic grist mill located at Poughquag, Dutchess County, New York.  It was built in 1889, and is a two-story, front-gabled, vernacular frame building with a stone and concrete foundation.  It has a one-story, hipped roof porch supported by simple contemporary posts.  Also on the property are the contributing ruins of a stone mill dam. During his 1909 campaign for New York State Senate, Franklin Delano Roosevelt gave a political speech from the porch of the mill building. The mill remained in use until about 1940.  Franklin Delano Roosevelt Jr. purchased the property in 1949 and the mill was used primarily for storage. During the mid-1980s, it was given to the Town of Beekman and restoration began in 2014.

It was added to the National Register of Historic Places in 2015 by local non-profit Youth for Restoration.

References 

Grinding mills in New York (state)
Industrial buildings and structures on the National Register of Historic Places in New York (state)
Industrial buildings completed in 1889
Buildings and structures in Dutchess County, New York
National Register of Historic Places in Dutchess County, New York
Grinding mills on the National Register of Historic Places in New York (state)